Utrecht railway station may refer to:
 Utrecht Centraal railway station
 Utrecht Lunetten railway station
 Utrecht Overvecht railway station
 Utrecht Terwijde railway station
 Utrecht Zuilen railway station